Ryan Watson is the name of:

Ryan Watson (actor) (born 1993), English actor and voice actor
Ryan Watson (cricketer) (born 1976), cricketer who plays for Scotland
Ryan Watson (footballer) (born 1993), English professional footballer for Tranmere Rovers
Ryan Watson (ice hockey) (born 1981), Italian-Canadian professional ice hockey player
Ryan Watson (New Zealand cricketer) (born 1994), New Zealand cricketer
Ryan Watson (politician), leader of the Green Party of Nova Scotia, 2008–2009